The Vervoost FV-3 Delphin is a German ultralight aircraft, designed and produced by Vervoost Leichtflugzeuge of Sinzig. It was first flown on 19 November 2009 and introduced at the AERO Friedrichshafen show in 2010. The aircraft is supplied as a complete ready-to-fly-aircraft.

Design and development
The FV-3 was originally designed as a research aircraft, but is also offered as a commercial model that complies with the Fédération Aéronautique Internationale microlight rules. It features a cantilever low-wing, a two-seats-in-tandem enclosed cockpit under a bubble canopy, fixed conventional landing gear and a single engine in tractor configuration.

The aircraft fuselage is made from welded steel tubing, with the aft part covered in doped aircraft fabric and the forward part covered in carbon fibre panels. The wings are designed like glider wings and are easily removed, while the tailplane folds to allow ground transportation or storage. The standard engine available is the  Rotax 912ULS four-stroke powerplant.

Variants
FV-3
Microlight version
FV-3F
Research version, with a second generator for flight instrumentation and equipment

Specifications (FV-3 Delphin)

References

External links

2010s German ultralight aircraft
Single-engined tractor aircraft